Blowfish are species of fish in the family Tetraodontidae.

Blowfish may also refer to:

 Porcupinefish, belonging to the family Diodontidae
 Blowfish (cipher), an encryption algorithm
 Blowfish (company), an American erotic goods supplier
 The Blowfish, a satirical newspaper at Brandeis University
 Lexington County Blowfish, a baseball team

See also
 Hootie & the Blowfish, an American rock band